Adam Jacobs born 17 may 1984  is an American actor and singer. He is best known for originating the title role of Aladdin in Disney's Aladdin on Broadway. He also starred as Marius in the Les Miserables 2006 Broadway Revival, and Simba in Disney's The Lion King on Broadway.

Background 
Born in Half Moon Bay, California, Jacobs initially studied piano at the San Francisco Conservatory of Music, beginning at the age of 5. He played the instrument for eight years and later found an interest in musical theater. Jacobs performed in local community theater and high school productions. To accumulate additional training, he also attended the summer programs of the American Conservatory Theater (ACT) in downtown SF and the California Institute of the Arts (CSSSA) in Valencia, California. When a representative from the San Francisco Opera saw him star in his high school's production of Evita, he asked Jacobs to audition for an upcoming documentary opera based on the story of Harvey Milk. Jacobs auditioned for the film and was cast as "Young Harvey". This allowed him to participate in both a performance marking the anniversary of Milk's assassination and the candlelight ceremony that took place prior to the show.

Jacobs studied at the NYU Tisch School of the Arts and graduated with a BFA in Theater. During this time, he also studied with the Collaborative Arts Project Musical Theater program (CAP21) and the Stonestreet Film and Television Studios program.

Career
Upon graduation from Tisch, Jacobs performed in regional theater and cruise lines. He toured the country as Cinderella's Prince in Into the Woods before landing his first Equity production as Nanki-poo in Marriott Theater's Hot Mikado.

Jacobs got his big break when he landed the role of "Marius" in the national tour of Les Miserables, a part he later played in the Broadway revival. Since then, Jacobs has starred in Mamma Mia! as Sky and The Lion King as Simba, both on Broadway. He also played the role of Daniel Beauxhomme in Paper Mill Playhouse's production of Once On This Island. Jacobs credits his mixed Filipino-Jewish ethnicity which has allowed him to play such varied roles.

In 2011, Jacobs began performing in the original cast in the musical Aladdin as the title role at the 5th Avenue Theatre in Seattle. In 2012, the musical put on several regional and international productions, and was given a Toronto tryout the following year. It opened on Broadway at the New Amsterdam Theatre on March 20, 2014.

Jacobs performed his last show in Broadway's Aladdin February 12, 2017. It was announced that he would continue playing Aladdin in the upcoming North American tour. The North American tour began April 11, 2017.

His debut solo album entitled “Right Where I Belong”, is a compilation of Alan Menken songs including well known tunes such as “Proud of Your Boy” (Aladdin), “Go The Distance” (Hercules), “Santa Fe” (Newsies), and “Suddenly Seymour” (Little Shop of Horrors in duet with his sister Arielle Jacobs) as well as a few lesser-known melodies from Menken’s earlier works.

Personal life 
Jacobs met his future wife, Kelly, performing in a Christmas show in Hershey, Pennsylvania. While she was performing as a dancer, he starred as the show's Santa Claus. The two were later married, and their twin boys were born on January 27, 2014. The family moved away from Hell's Kitchen and moved to Wilmette, IL in 2018. Jacobs' younger sister, Arielle Jacobs, is also a successful theater actress and is currently starring as Princess Jasmine in Disney's Aladdin on Broadway.

Filmography

Film

Television

Theater

References

External links
 
 
 
 

1984 births
21st-century American male actors
21st-century American singers
Living people
People from Half Moon Bay, California
Male actors from California
American male musical theatre actors
Tisch School of the Arts alumni